"Mr. Krinkle" is a song by the American rock band Primus. It was released as the 3rd single from their 1993 album Pork Soda.

Track listing
1. "Mr. Krinkle" - 5:27

Music video
A video was made for the single featuring the band performing in an abandoned warehouse as a carnival of oddities parades behind them. Les Claypool is dressed as a fat, tuxedo-wearing pig playing an upright bass, Larry LaLonde as an 80's glam rocker, and Tim Alexander in a kabuki attire. Claypool's wife and her twin sister are also featured. 

Due to logistical issues, the video had to be shot in one take. Claypool said he put his "heart and soul" into the video, but it received next to no airtime on MTV. In an interview with Guitar World magazine, Claypool disparaged the channel's unwillingness to air the video, saying "it got played like six times." It did, however, receive some airplay on Headbangers Ball. "The Making of Mr. Krinkle" was released on Animals Should Not Try to Act Like People.

"Mr. Krinkle" did not chart in the U.S.

See also
 Pork Soda

References

Primus (band) songs
Interscope Records singles
1993 singles
Songs written by Les Claypool
1993 songs
Songs written by Larry LaLonde
Songs written by Tim Alexander